SOPHIA.org is a website which offers free educational tutorials, free certification programs for teachers, as well as low-cost online college credit courses.

History
SOPHIA.org was founded by Don Smithmier, It launched in public beta in March 2011.  By 2013 the site was being used by more than 70,000 students and teachers around the world.

Student resources
SOPHIA.org has more than 34,000 free, short-form tutorials developed by over 6,000 teachers including 50 developed by Bill Nye The Science Guy and tutorials developed by physicians at the Mayo Clinic.  The tutorials are available in a variety of multimedia formats including screencasts, videos, slideshows and podcasts.

In September 2012, SOPHIA introduced nine college-level online courses known as SOPHIA Pathways for College Credit (SPCC). Students complete courses on their own time and at their own pace. The courses have been recommended for college credit by the American Council on Education’s College Credit Recommendation Service and have been approved by the Distance Education Accreditation Commission (DEAC) for Approved Quality Curriculum (AQC) status.

Educator resources
SOPHIA provides free tools and resources for teachers to create and share lessons, develop private classroom groups for student discussion, and monitor analytics and progress.

SOPHIA also provides free professional development resources created in cooperation with Capella University’s School of Education faculty. New Classrooms uses SOPHIA-created math content in its adaptive learning model

Sophia.org also conducts surveys on educational topics and hold contests.

References 

American educational websites